is a Japanese former Nippon Professional Baseball player. He played for the Yomiuri Giants (1976–1989).

He managed the Yokohama DeNA BayStars for four seasons from 2011 to 2015.

External links

1954 births
Living people
Baseball people from Fukushima Prefecture
Komazawa University alumni
Japanese baseball players
Nippon Professional Baseball infielders
Yomiuri Giants players
Managers of baseball teams in Japan
Yokohama DeNA BayStars managers
Japanese sportsperson-politicians